was a feudal domain under the Tokugawa shogunate of Edo period Japan, located in Ise Province in former Hisai town (now part of the modern-day city of Tsu, Mie Prefecture). It was centered around Hisai jin'ya. Hisai Domain was a sub-domain of Tsu Domain ruled by a cadet branch of the Tōdō clan.

History
Under Tōdō Takatora, Tsu Domain had a kokudaka of 323,000 koku. However, in 1669 on the retirement of his son Tōdō Takatsugu, 50,000 koku of his holdings were split off to allow his second son Tōdō Takamichi to establish a cadet branch of the clan. This was done to provide an alternate line of succession, in the event that the main lineage of the clan failed to provide a male heir, and to thus avoid the possibility of attainder, which was a constant concern for the tozama daimyo. Although Hisai Domain was styled as a "castle-holding domain", Tōdō Takamichi was not permitted to build a Japanese castle, but had to be content with a jin'ya, or fortified residence. Tōdō Takamichi's successor, Tōdō Takakata brought another 3000 koku to the domain, raising its kokudaka to 53,000 koku. As a sub-domain of Tsu Domain, Hisai Domain as a rule followed the customs and direction of the parent house; however, the domain was plagued by many misfortunes. The domain's Edo residence burned down five times, and the domain suffered frequently from crop failures and natural disasters. On them other hand, the parent house suffered frequently from lack of a direct heir, and many of the daimyō of Tsu Domain assumed that post after gaining experience in administering Hisai. The domain's financial situation was especially bad after the Great Tenmei famine of 1782 to 1788. However due to the reforms initiated by the 12th daimyō of Tsu, Tōdō Takasato, the finances of the domain were restored. After his death, problems arose again, until the time of the 15th daimyō Tōdō Takayori in the Bakumatsu period, with the development of new rice lands and flood control works on the Kumozu River. With the start of the Boshin War, Hisai Domain followed Tsu Domain's lead in joining with the Satchō Alliance forces. Following the establishment of the Meiji government and the 1871 abolition of the han system, the territory of Hisai Domain became part of Mie prefecture in 1876.

The Hisai jin'ya was located on the outskirts of Tsu, at what is now the grounds of the Hisai Junior High School.

List of daimyō

See also 
 List of Han
 Abolition of the han system

References

Domains of Japan
1871 disestablishments in Japan
Ise Province
History of Mie Prefecture
Tsu, Mie